María Angeles Ruiz Castillo (born 18 March 1990) is a Spanish field hockey player for the Spanish national team.

She participated at the 2018 Women's Hockey World Cup.

Individual award : Goalkeeper of the Tournament in 2019 Women's EuroHockey Nations Championship

References

1990 births
Living people
Spanish female field hockey players
Female field hockey goalkeepers
Club de Campo Villa de Madrid players
Field hockey players at the 2020 Summer Olympics
Olympic field hockey players of Spain